Kenji Wu (born 18 October 1979) is a Taiwanese singer, songwriter, actor and director.

Early life
Wu was born on 18 October 1979 in Kaohsiung, Taiwan. When he was six, he moved to Argentina, but came back to Taiwan to compete in MTV Taiwan's "New Artist Fight Game".

He attended the National Taiwan University of Arts majoring in theater.

Career
After competing in the "New Artist Fight Game" competition in 2000, he was subsequently signed to Virgin Music. Within half a year, Wu released his debut album Tomorrow, Alone (一個人的Tomorrow). Despite the involvement of top producers, the album received lukewarm response and weak sales. However, this gave him opportunities to act in Taiwanese drama such as Peach Girl and Moonlight Forest. During his time acting, he continued to perform songs he wrote and composed at pubs.

With an intense passion for music, Wu made a comeback to the music industry in November 2004 with a self-titled album, released by Seed Music. All ten songs in the album were written by him. Critics around Asia gave highly positive reviews. The hit song Wu Ke Qun cleverly incorporated the impersonations of well-known singers such as A-do, Leehom Wang, David Tao, Jay Chou, Fei Yu Ching, Emil Chau and Shin band. The song demonstrated Wu's determination to be a unique singer in his own right. In Hong Kong, it peaked at the 7th spot out of 20 in RTHK's Chinese chart for the week of 20–26 February 2005; however, the song did poorly in Singapore, debuting at 19th position on YES 933's chart for the week of 9–15 January 2005, and remained on the chart for only 2 weeks.

He returned in October 2005 with a new album titled The Kenji Show (大頑家 – 吳克群), also released by Seed Music. Working on a theme of having fun, the album comprises songs with his style of simple yet intriguing lyrics. Songs like "Da She Tou" (literally "Big Tongue") and "Bu Xie Ji Nian" rose to hit charts and were popular among students mostly.  He has nominated for the best Chinese male singer in Taiwan at the 2006 and 2007 Golden Melody Awards, but the award went to Leehom Wang and Korean-born singer Nicky Lee, respectively.

In 2006, Wu released a new album entitled A General Order (將軍令) and again, all songs were written by Wu himself showing his creativity. This time he experimented with the Chinese music style, therefore the title song was written in that way. Other Chinese style songs including "Peaked You And Me" and "Champion" as well as the hit ballad "Cripple" are featured on this album. Wu will also be featured on a track on Hakka-Pac's album called Doing it Chikan Style. He also had a cameo appearance in Brown Sugar Macchiato.

In 2008, he release the album Poems For You (為你寫詩), in which he composed all the songs. This album was number one on the sales chart for 7 weeks. All of the five MVs that were released from this album were ranked in the top 10 in two of the largest KTV chains, thus breaking a record.

Aside from writing songs only for his own albums, he also composed and produced songs for other popular singers. He wrote "Ai Ku Gui" for Maggie Chiang, "Sha Gua" for Landy Wen, "Nan Ren Nu Ren" for Valen Hsu and A Mu Long, and "Da Ming Xing" for the superboys Yu Hao Ming and Wang Yue Xin.

In 2010, he released his eighth studio album Love Me, Hate Me (愛我 恨我) under Seed Music. The track "沒關係" (No Relations) is listed at number 24 on Hit Fm Taiwan's Hit Fm Annual Top 100 Singles Chart (Hit-Fm年度百首單曲) for 2010.

Discography

 A Lonely Tomorrow (一個人的Tomorrow) (2000)
 First Creative Album (吳克群) (2004)
 The Kenji Show (大頑家) (2005)
 General's Command (將軍令) (2006)
 Poems for You (為你寫詩) (2008)
 Love Me, Hate Me (愛我 恨我) (2010)
 Parasitism (寄生) (2010)
 How To Deal With Loneliness? (寂寞來了怎麼辦？) (2012)
 On The Way to the Stars (數星星的人) (2015)
 Humorous Life (人生超幽默) (2017)
 I Am Listening (你說 我聽著呢) (2020)

Selected compositions
 2007 – "瘋了瘋了" (Going Mad) for Genie Chuo in Oxygenie of Happiness
 2008 – "女生" (Girl) for Hey Girl in Hey Girl Self-Title Albunm
 2010 – "錯的人" (Wrong Person) for Elva Hsiao in Miss Elva

Filmography

Television series

Film

Variety and reality show

Music videos

As director

Appearances

Awards and nominations

References

External links

1979 births
Living people
Taiwanese male singer-songwriters
Taiwanese male film actors
Taiwanese male television actors
Male actors from Kaohsiung
Taiwanese Mandopop singer-songwriters
National Taiwan University of Arts alumni
21st-century Taiwanese male singers
21st-century Taiwanese male actors
Musicians from Kaohsiung
Writers from Kaohsiung